Stiriodes is a genus of moths of the family Noctuidae.

Species
 Stiriodes demo (Druce, 1889)

Former species
 Stiriodes edentata is now Azenia edentata (Grote, 1883)
 Stiriodes obtusa is now Azenia obtusa (Herrich-Schäffer, 1854)
 Stiriodes perflava is now Azenia perflava (Harvey, 1875)
 Stiriodes virida is now Azenia virida (Barnes & McDunnough, 1916)

References
Natural History Museum Lepidoptera genus database
Stiriodes at funet

Hadeninae